The 2015 LNB Pro A Leaders Cup season was the 3rd edition of the Leaders Cup. The event included the eight top teams from the first half of the 2014–15 LNB Pro A regular season and was played in Disneyland Paris.

Final

References

Leaders Cup
Leaders Cup